La Femme invisible  is a 2008 film.

Synopsis 
A young black woman searches for the faces of her community in the film posters. Her obsessive search will lead her to the brink of madness.

External links 

 

2008 films
Cameroonian drama films
2008 drama films
French drama short films
Cameroonian short films
2000s French films